K. R. Periyakaruppan is the Minister of Co-operatives for The Government of Tamil Nadu. He was formerly the Minister of Rural Development and Poverty Alleviation. He also served as the former minister for Hindu Religious and Charitable Endowments in Tamil Nadu. He was born in Aralikkottai on December 30, 1959. He has finished his bachelor's degree in Commerce and Law. He was elected consecutively  to the Tamil Nadu legislative assembly from Tirupattur constituency (Sivaganga district)  in 2006, 2011, 2016 and 2021 elections as a Dravida Munnetra Kazhagam candidate.

References 

Dravida Munnetra Kazhagam politicians
1959 births
Living people
Tamil Nadu ministers
Tamil Nadu MLAs 2021–2026
Tamil Nadu MLAs 2016–2021